Catherine Healy (née Strong) (born Kells, died 1993) was an Irish Michelin star winning head chef during her spell in the kitchen of restaurant Dunderry Lodge.

According to the Irish Independent, she may have been Ireland's greatest female chef.

She, and her husband Nick, sold the restaurant in 1990, due to a terminal illness.

Awards
 Michelin star 1986-1989
 Red M 1981-1985
 One star Egon Ronay Guide 1983-1985 and 1987–1988.

References 

1993 deaths
Head chefs of Michelin starred restaurants
Irish chefs
Women chefs
Year of birth missing